Leave It To Me may refer to:

 Leave It to Me (1920 film), a 1920 American film by Emmett J. Flynn
 Leave It to Me (1930 film), a 1930 British film
 Leave It to Me (1933 film), a 1933 British film
 Leave It to Me (1937 film), a 1937 British film
 Leave It to Me (1955 film), a 1955 Czech film
 Leave It to Me!, a 1938 musical
 Leave It to Me (novel), a 1997 American novel
 "Leave It to Me" (song), the third single by Irish art rock quartet Director